Decillionix was a company based in Sunnyvale, California which sold computer music hardware and software in the mid-1980s. Its first product was the DX-1 for the Apple II, sold in 1983. The DX-1 consisted of a monophonic 8-bit audio input card, a monophonic 8-bit audio output card, and the DX-1 Effects II software. Decillionix later produced MIDI software and hardware.

Decillionix was run by Dan Retzinger.

Decillionix ceased operations in 1987.

Products

 Original DX-1 two-card sampler, and Effects II software for Apple II (1983)
 Single card version of the hardware for Apple II (1984)
 Splash, an audio visualization program for Apple II (1984)
 Echo II, an effects program for Apple II (1985)
 P-Drum, a percussion sequencing program for Apple II (1985)
 Synthestra, an hierarchical MIDI sequencing program for Apple II (1986)
 The Box, a standalone MIDI effects device (1986)

Splash, P-Drum, and Synthestra were written by David Van Brink who also wrote Tubeway.

References

Defunct computer companies based in California
Defunct computer companies of the United States
Defunct software companies of the United States
Software companies based in the San Francisco Bay Area
Companies based in Sunnyvale, California
Computer companies established in 1983
Software companies established in 1983
Computer companies disestablished in 1987
Software companies disestablished in 1987
1983 establishments in California
1987 disestablishments in California
Defunct companies based in the San Francisco Bay Area